Timothy Brooks (born 1971) is an American former professional basketball player, who played for Olimpas Plungė in Lithuania. He is better known, however, for his collegiate career at the University of Tennessee at Chattanooga.

College career
After two years of playing junior college basketball, Brooks transferred to Chattanooga in the fall of 1991, to spend his final two years of National Collegiate Athletic Association (NCAA) eligibility, to play for the Mocs. Brooks established himself as one of the best players to ever suit up for the program. As of 2013, and in only two seasons of competition, he is still tied for second for the most assists (414) in a career, while he holds the top single season records for assists (209) and steals (83) in a season. He was a two-time First Team All-Southern Conference (SoCon) selection, and as a senior, he was the SoCon tournament MVP. Brooks led the Mocs to their first NCAA tournament in five years, when they earned a berth in 1993. In addition, he was named the SoCon Player of the Year in 1992–93.

Professional career
The National Basketball Association (NBA) invited Brooks to their NBA draft Camp, after his collegiate career ended. However, Brooks never made an NBA roster. He several seasons professionally in Lithuania and spent the 1996–97 season with COB Saint-Brieuc CA in the French LNB Pro B.

Personal
As of February 2008, Brooks lived in Nashville, Tennessee, and worked for FedEx, as an operations supervisor.

References

External links
Eurobasket.com Profile
Proballers.com Profile
LNB Profile

1971 births
Living people
American expatriate basketball people in Lithuania
Basketball players from Louisville, Kentucky
Chattanooga Mocs men's basketball players
Junior college men's basketball players in the United States
Basketball players from Nashville, Tennessee
Point guards
American men's basketball players